Norman Robert Rowe (6 March 1926 – 6 April 2016) was a Canadian rower. He competed in the men's eight event at the 1952 Summer Olympics.

References

1926 births
2016 deaths
Canadian male rowers
Olympic rowers of Canada
Rowers at the 1952 Summer Olympics
Place of birth missing